Noé Murayama (July 4, 1930 – August 25, 1997) was a Mexican actor, who starred in numerous Mexican films.

Biography
Noé was born in Ciudad del Maíz in the state of San Luis Potosí, Mexico. His father was Japanese Mexican. His name is a Spanish form of the name Noah.

Noé studied to be a dentist.

He played a key role in the Mexican soap opera El pecado de Oyuki. He also appeared in Esmeralda as Fermín.

His son is actor Claudio Rojo.

Selected filmography
 Sonatas (1959)
 To Each His Life (1960)
 Guns for San Sebastian (1968)
 The Infernal Rapist (1988)

References

External links
 

1930 births
1997 deaths
Mexican people of Japanese descent
Male actors from San Luis Potosí
Mexican male film actors
Mexican male telenovela actors
Mexican male television actors
20th-century Mexican male actors
Male actors of Japanese descent